Tur Peak is a distinctive peak (1,470 m) at the southeast periphery of Malta Plateau, situated along the north wall of lower Mariner Glacier 4.5 nautical miles (8 km) south-southeast of Mount Alberts, in Victoria Land. Mapped by United States Geological Survey (USGS) from surveys and U.S. Navy air photos, 1960–64. Named by Advisory Committee on Antarctic Names (US-ACAN) for Lieutenant Juan J. Tur, U.S. Navy Reserve, medical officer at Hallett Station, 1957.

Mountains of Victoria Land
Borchgrevink Coast